Admiral Sir Hugh Palliser, 1st Baronet (26 February 1723 – 19 March 1796) was a Royal Navy officer. As captain of the 58-gun HMS Eagle he engaged and defeated the French 50-gun Duc d'Aquitain off Ushant in May 1757 during the Seven Years' War. He went on to serve as Commodore Governor of Newfoundland, then Controller of the Navy and then First Naval Lord. During the American Revolutionary War he came into a famous dispute with Augustus Keppel over his conduct as third-in-command of the Channel Fleet at the inconclusive Battle of Ushant in July 1778; the dispute led to Palliser being court-martialled, although he was subsequently acquitted. In retirement Palliser became Governor of Greenwich Hospital.

Early life
Palliser was the only son of Hugh Palliser and Mary Robinson and was born at Kirk Deighton, in the West Riding of Yorkshire (now in North Yorkshire). The family had estates in Yorkshire and Ireland. His parents died when he was still young, so he and his sisters were (probably) raised by relatives on his mother's side. He entered the navy in 1735 as a midshipman on HMS Aldborough commanded by his uncle Nicholas Robinson. He followed his uncle to HMS Kennington in 1737, and then to HMS Tiger and HMS Essex.

Palliser passed his lieutenant's examination on 12 May 1741 and was promoted to the rank on 18 September 1741. He continued to serve aboard Essex, at first under Robinson, and after he was superseded, under Captain Richard Norris, the son of Sir John Norris. In February 1746 he was placed in command of HMS Weazel. On 25 November 1746 he was appointed post-captain in HMS Captain, sailing for the West Indies with the broad pennant of Commodore Edward Legge. Legge died on 19 September 1747, and Palliser transferred to HMS Sutherland. Six months later an accidental fire in that ship's arms chest wounded Palliser; a ball entered his back and exited his groin; another ball struck his right hip; a third ball struck his left shoulder. Two other men were killed in the explosion. Palliser returned to England to recover, but remained lame in his left leg, and suffered perpetual and sometimes excruciating pain to which his death was eventually attributed.
 
He returned to active service in December 1748 and was appointed to command the frigate , sailing her to the East Indies to bring news of the treaty of Aix-la-Chapelle which concluded Britain's role in the War of the Austrian Succession. Palliser was then part of Edward Boscawen's squadron on the Coromandel coast from July 1749, returning to Britain to pay off Sheerness in April 1750. Shortly afterwards he was moved to the much smaller 20-gun , A difficulty arose when Scottish authorities accused a sailor from Seahorse of circulating a forged letter of indenture, in order to receive greater pay. The sailor took refuge aboard the ship, and Palliser refused to hand him over. Palliser was thereupon arrested in the sailor's place and held for several days in the Tolbooth Jail in Edinburgh. He was eventually released by order of the Scottish Lords of Session, who invoked their authority to supersede that of the judge of the vice-admiralty court in Edinburgh who had sought to commit Palliser for trial.
 
Palliser sailed in January 1755, directing the convoy in a long southern arc across the Atlantic, as far as the Tropic of Cancer. This represented a substantial deviation from the traditional and more direct easterly route, but enabled the convoy to travel in calmer weather and avoid the risk of losing transports to storms. The unorthodox navigation won Palliser some praise from British authorities.

Seven Years' War

The ongoing friction between Britain and France ignited into open warfare in 1755. In October of that year Palliser was placed in command of the 58-gun HMS Eagle. That ship engaged and defeated the French 50-gun Duc d'Aquitain off Ushant on 30 May 1757.  After that battle Eagle returned to port for repairs, and Palliser moved to command of the 74-gun HMS Shrewsbury, part of the Channel Fleet under George Anson.
 
In that ship in July 1758 he grounded and captured several French ships near Brest. In 1759 Palliser participated in the successful British capture of Quebec City, commanding the seamen who landed and took possession of Lower Town. In 1760 Palliser was sent to the Mediterranean Sea to chase a small French squadron which had slipped out of the port at Toulon. He bottled the French boats up at several ports in Turkey. In 1761 Palliser captured a Danish merchant ship from a small convoy off Sardinia, escorted by the Dano-Norwegian ship of the line HDMS Grønland, in a shrewd operation, where no shots were fired. It was a precarious operation, as Denmark-Norway was neutral in the war, but Palliser had intelligence information informing him that the Danish ships were in fact shipping goods from the Levant to Marseilles for French merchants, a practice, which ended after the incident.
In 1762 Palliser commanded a four-ship armada dispatched to retake St. John's, Newfoundland, but the area was already in British control when he arrived following the Battle of Signal Hill.

Governor of Newfoundland and subsequent service
In 1764 Palliser was named Governor and Commander-in-Chief at Newfoundland.  He had under his command the 50-gun , and several frigates.  His forces encountered a similar French force which was ostensibly regulating their remaining fishing grounds in the area, but Palliser perceived that they had altered their maps to show they controlled more area than had been agreed upon in the negotiations which ended the conflict in this area.  The French minister in London used this clash to complain to the British government against Palliser, but he was able to produce sufficient maps and supporting material to convince his superiors of his correct actions.
 
Palliser actively supported the fisheries as a source of trained seamen for the Royal Navy. As such he took active steps to enforce the provisions of Treaty of Paris (1763) restricting French access to their specific fishing rights. He also sought to restrict further settlement of Newfoundland, so to encourage the British-based industry.
 
Palliser remained Governor of Newfoundland until 1768. In 1770 Commodore Palliser was appointed Comptroller of the Navy, and in that same year was elected an elder brother of the Trinity House, which oversees British lighthouses and provides general expertise to the government on naval matters.
 
In 1773 Palliser was made Baronet. In 1774 he was elected to Parliament for the Borough of Scarborough. On 31 March 1775 he achieved flag rank when promoted to rear-admiral. Under the Earl of Sandwich he joined the Board of Admiralty as First Naval Lord in April 1775 and received the sinecure of Lieutenant-General of Marines. Palliser was promoted to vice-admiral on 29 January 1778. He stood down from the Admiralty Board in September 1779.

Palliser's Act
With his involvement in fisheries and seamen training, in 1775 Palliser initiated legislation to encourage and regulate ship fisheries in Newfoundland. The act (15 Geo. 3 c.31) is commonly known as Palliser’s Act (15 Geo. 3 c.31), but also called the Newfoundland Fisheries Act 1775; its long title is An act for the encouragement of the Fisheries carried on, from Great Britain, Ireland, and the British Dominions in Europe, and for securing the return of the fishermen, sailors, and others employed in the said fisheries, to the ports thereof, at the end of the fishing season.
 
Historian Sean Cadigan, author of Hope and Deception in Conception Bay (1995), has since linked Palliser's Act with the high-valuation of women's labour in 18th Century Newfoundland.  Given that Palliser's Act required producers to pre-pay their labourers for the fishing season, producers developed little incentive to hire outside of their families: hired labour was high risk because pre-paid wages reduced producers' margin for gain (or loss).  As such, Palliser's Act inspired the merger of household labour with the market, making women's work essential to the economic success of the colony.

Service during the American War of Independence and controversy with Admiral Keppel

In 1778 Palliser was appointed to the Channel Fleet under Admiral Augustus Keppel. On 27 July 1778 in the First Battle of Ushant, the Channel Fleet fought an inconclusive battle with the French fleet. The battle's outcome led to personal acrimony between Palliser and Keppel, resulted in their individual courts martial and increased divisiveness in the Navy. Palliser was forced to resign from Parliament and his other posts.
 
The July 1778 Battle of Ushant came about when the British fleet found that it had become located between the French ships and their home ports. Seeing the sudden advantage, Keppel ordered that a battle line be formed and an attack made. Palliser's ship  was badly damaged in the ensuing fray, and when Keppel hoisted the signal to reform the battle line, Palliser's division was some distance away, so a frigate was dispatched to give the instruction.  Due to the battle damage, Palliser's division was unable to comply until later in the evening, when it was too late to continue the battle, and the French withdrew to Brest. Both sides later claimed victory, and Keppel issued a dispatch which commended all his officers for their conduct in the action.
 
Palliser heard rumours that Keppel had intimated in private conversations that Palliser's absence had been the cause of the inconclusive outcome, so Palliser wrote a paper defending his actions. An anonymous letter to a London newspaper accused Palliser of disobedience in the battle, and he called on Keppel to refute the allegation. When no public refutation was forthcoming, Palliser demanded that a court martial be held to try Keppel on charges of "misconduct and neglect of duty" (which carried a death sentence if proved). Keppel's court martial was held at Portsmouth in January 1779, and he was acquitted after 27 days, the court finding that the charges against him had been brought with malicious intent and were unfounded. The court-martial outcome meant ruin for Palliser. He was defended by Lord Sandwich, but still had to resign from Parliament and as Lieutenant-General of the Marines. He then demanded that a court martial be convened against him so that he could present his version of events during his defence. The court martial was convened, and he was acquitted after 21 days. However, he was censured in that he had failed to inform his superior officer of the battle damage in a timely manner.
 
After his acquittal Palliser hoped to be reinstated as Lieutenant-General of Marines. Instead, in 1780 he was appointed Governor of Greenwich Hospital by Lord Sandwich, and was again elected to Parliament for Huntingdon (1780–1784). On 24 September 1787 he was promoted to full admiral.

Association with James Cook

 
James Cook, a fellow Yorkshireman, first served under Palliser as Master's Mate of HMS Eagle from 1755 to 1758. Palliser would have supported his elevation to Master in 1757. Both were present at the siege of Quebec where Cook charted the approach to the city and the landing area. Following the Treaty of Paris, Cook was charged with surveying Newfoundland. As Governor, Palliser actively supported Cook's work and assisted in the publication of his acclaimed map of Newfoundland. During his term as Comptroller, Palliser supported Cook's first command of exploration in 1768, and his subsequent voyages. Cook named Cape Palliser, Palliser Bay and Palliser Isles after his "worthy friend". On Cook's death, Palliser erected a memorial to Cook at the Vache, his estate near Chalfont St Giles in Buckinghamshire.

Death
Palliser died on 19 March 1796 at the Vache, and was buried on 26 March 1796 at the parish church of St Giles where there is a memorial to him. The Palliser Baronetcy passed to his great-nephew Hugh Palliser Walters who assumed by Royal Licence dated 18 January 1798 the surname and arms of Palliser. Palliser's illegitimate son George Thomas inherited the estate of the Vache.

Notes

a.  Some sources use the Old Style dating system, in use in Britain until 1752, for Palliser's birth. As under this system the new year did not begin until 25 March, Palliser's birth was recorded as being in 1722. The article Admiral Sir HUGH PALLISER, Bt 1723–1796, taken from Charnock, J. Biographia navalis . . from 1660 to the present time (6 volumes), states that Palliser was born "on 26 February 1722" (although the title of the article indicates he was born in 1723). The Royal Naval Museum website, accessed 6 August 2009, provides a biography, Biography: Hugh Palliser, which states that Palliser "was born on 26th February 1723". The Government House website, accessed 6 August 2009, provides a biography, Palliser, Sir Hugh (1722–1796). It states that Palliser "was born ... on February 22, 1722. The Dictionary of Canadian Biography Online, accessed 6 August 2009 provides a biography, which states: PALLISER (Pallisser), Sir HUGH, "b. 22 Feb. 1722/23". Contemporary scholarship by the Oxford Dictionary of National Biography places his birth date as 26 February 1723.

References

Sources

External links

Palliser's monument to Cook, Chalfont St.Giles
Will of Hugh Palliser
Biography at Government House The Governorship of Newfoundland and Labrador

Text of Palliser's Act, (15 Geo.III c.31)
 

|-

|-

|-

1723 births
1796 deaths
Royal Navy admirals
Baronets in the Baronetage of Great Britain
Members of the Parliament of Great Britain for English constituencies
Governors of Newfoundland Colony
British military personnel of the French and Indian War
Royal Navy personnel of the American Revolutionary War
People from Chalfont St Giles
People from the Borough of Harrogate
Royal Navy personnel of the Seven Years' War
18th-century Royal Navy personnel
British MPs 1774–1780
British MPs 1780–1784
Sea captains
Lords of the Admiralty
Members of Trinity House